Hamburg International Luftverkehrsgesellschaft mbH & Co. Betriebs KG was an independent passenger airline based in Hamburg-Nord, Hamburg, Germany, operating scheduled charter services for European tour operators, as well as ad hoc charters and subservices. Its main base was Hamburg Airport, with further bases at Friedrichshafen Airport, Munich Airport and Saarbrücken Airport.

History 
The airline was established in July 1998 and started operations on 28 April 1999. It was wholly owned by its management and local venture capitalists and had 215 employees (at March 2007). 

After several charter contracts were revoked, Hamburg International went bankrupt on 19 October 2010. All aircraft were returned to their lessors, and all flights were cancelled with immediate effect.

Fleet 

Over the years, Hamburg International operated the following aircraft types:

References

External links

Defunct airlines of Germany
Airlines established in 1998
Airlines disestablished in 2010
Companies based in Hamburg
1998 establishments in Germany
2010 disestablishments in Germany